Frances Kornbluth (July 26, 1920 – May 26, 2014) was an American abstract expressionist painter.

Biography
Frances Kornbluth was born in New York City on July 26, 1920. Originally intent on becoming a composer, Kornbluth graduated from Brooklyn College in 1940 with a degree in music; however, in the 1950s she focused her creative energies on painting. Kornbluth studied at the Brooklyn Museum Art School from 1955 to 1959, where she first met Reuben Tam, and went on to receive a master's degree from the Pratt Institute in 1962. It was Tam who first introduced Kornbluth to Monhegan Island and helped define her as an artist. Kornbluth died on May 26, 2014 at the age of 93.

Works
The natural environment was the primary source of Kornbluth's inspiration, particularly that of Monhegan Island where she summered and painted from 1959 to 2013. Kornbluth painted at her studio in Lobster Cove on Monhegan and at her studio in Northeastern Connecticut. She worked in oil, pastel, acrylic, watercolor, ink and mixed media collage. Her work continues to be exhibited in both galleries and museums. Recent exhibits include:

 "Collage: Piecing It Together" at the Portland Museum of Art (2010)
 "On Island: Women Artists of Monhegan" at the University of New England (2007)
 "Monhegan: The Abstracted Island" at the Bates College Museum of Art (2001)
 "Overview: Four Decades" at the University of Connecticut (1996)

Awards
 Lifetime Achievement Award, Brooklyn College (2000)
 Miriam E. Halpern Memorial Award, National Association of Women Artists (1992)
 John Carl Georgo Memorial Award, National Association of Women Artists (1989)
 Elizabeth Morse Genius Foundation Prize, National Association of Women Artists (1982)
 Helen Henningson Memorial Prize for Oil, National Association of Women Artists (1977)
 Charles H. Woodbury Prize for Landscape, National Association of Women Artists (1975)
 The Elizabeth Rungius Fulda Memorial Prize for Lyrical Landscape, National Association of Women Artists (1968)
 Medal of Honor, National Association of Women Artists (1968)
 Catherine & Henry J. Gaisman Prize for Watercolor, National Association of Women Artists (1961)
 Medal of Honor, National Association of Women Artists (1961)

References

External links
Website of Frances Kornbluth
Frances Kornbluth on AskART

1920 births
2014 deaths
20th-century American painters
20th-century American women artists
21st-century American painters
21st-century American women artists
Abstract expressionist artists
Artists from New York (state)
Brooklyn College alumni
Pratt Institute alumni
National Association of Women Artists members
American women painters
Painters from Maine
Jewish women painters
Jewish painters